Zulfiker Ali Bhutto is a Jatiya Party (Ershad) politician and the former Member of Parliament of Jhalokati-2.

Career
Bhutto was elected to parliament from Jhalokati-2 as a Jatiya Party candidate in 1986 and 1988.

References

Jatiya Party politicians
3rd Jatiya Sangsad members
4th Jatiya Sangsad members
7th Jatiya Sangsad members
Year of birth missing
20th-century Bengalis
People from Jhalokati district
2000 deaths